Chityala Ilamma ( – 10 September 1985), better known as Chakali Ilamma,  was an Indian revolutionary leader during the Telangana Rebellion. Her act of defiance against Zamindar Ramachandra Reddy, known as Visnoor Deshmukh, to cultivate her land, became an inspiration for many during the rebellion against the feudal lords of the Telangana region.

Early and personal life 
Chityala Ilamma was born in 1895 as the fourth child of Oruganti Mallamma and Sailu in Krishnapuram of Warangal district, of present-day Telangana, India. She belongs to Rajaka caste.

Ilamma was married to Chityala Narasimah at the age of 11. The couple had four sons and a daughter.

Career 
Ilamma took the red flag against the anarchy of Deshmukh and Razakar in Visnur between 1940 and 1944.

She joined the Andhra Mahasabha as well as the Communist Party of India. She worked actively against the Nizam government and her house was the center for activities conducted against the feudal land lords who collaborated with the Nizam.

Death

Ilamma died on 10 September 1985 at Palakurthi due to illness.

References

Participants in the Telangana Rebellion
Telangana Rebellion
People from Nalgonda
1985 deaths
1890s births
Indian independence activists from Telangana
Communist Party of India politicians from Telangana
Female politicians of the Communist Party of India